Xiong Naijin (born 14 October 1982) is a Chinese actress. She is best known for her roles as Zhou Jiamin on How Much Sorrow Do You Have, Princess Weichang on The Prince of Han Dynasty Part 3: Iron Blood and the Pages of History and Cong Hui on Ice and Fire of Youth, and has also starred in a number of films, including The First President, Tai Chi 0, Tai Chi Hero, The Deathday Party, and Ex-Files.

Early life and education
Xiong was born in Chongqing, China, on October 14, 1982. In 1997 she attended the Sichuan Arts School. One year later, she entered the Sichuan Troupe of Ballad Singers, where she worked as a Qingyin actress. In 2002 she was accepted to Beijing Film Academy and graduated in 2006.

Acting career
In 2003, when she was a freshman at Beijing Film Academy, Xiong made her acting debut in Crime Scene, playing a policewoman.

In 2004, she played Zhou Jiamin, Queen Zhou the Younger in the historical melodrama How Much Sorrow Do You Have. That same year, she also starred in the costume mystery drama Dixue Feicui.

In 2005, she had a key supporting role in the historical television series The Prince of Han Dynasty, playing the daughter (Princess Weichang) of Huang Xiaoming's and Ruping's characters. That same year, she had a minor role as Qiu Xiang in the costume drama The First Marriage.

In 2006, she was cast in the lead role of Wulan in the wuxia television series Big Shots, based on the novel by the same name by Gu Long.

In 2008, she appeared in The Last Prince, a historical television series starring Feng Yuanzheng and Xu Fan. That same year, she co-starred with Chen Kun and Li Xiaoran in Remembrance of Dreams Past.

In 2009, she participated in Ghost Catcher - Legend of Beauty, a shenmo television series.

In 2010, she filmed in All Men Are Brothers as Yan Xijiao, adapted from Shi Nai'an's classical novel Water Margin.  That same year, she had a cameo appearance in the fantasy historical drama Beauty World. She made her film debut in Choy Lee Fut Kung Fu, a Kung fu film.

In 2011, she headlined the comedy film Scheme With Me. She then appeared in the film The First President, in which she played Soong Ai-ling. She also featured in romance film Great Wall My Love.

In 2012, she had a supporting role in the martial arts film Tai Chi 0 and its sequel, Tai Chi Hero. She played the female lead role in Li Qilin's romantic comedy film Rhapsody of BMW. She then starred in the war television series Jiu He Ru Hai.

In 2013, she starred in the romantic comedy television series Destiny by Love. She played the female lead role in the suspense thriller film The Deathday Party. 

In 2014, she co-starred in the romantic comedy television series My Amazing Bride, and youth drama Ice and Fire of Youth. She had a minor role as Mengmeng in romantic comedy film Ex-Files.

In 2015, she dubbed the voice of Chang'e in the animated film Mr. Nian. The same year, she guest-starred on the fantasy series Noble Aspirations playing Youji, one of four great messengers of the Ghost King Faction.

In 2016, Xiong Naijin had a key supporting role in Phoenix Warriors, a fantasy television series adaptation based on the novel Meiren Mou by Bing Lansha.

In 2017, she starred in the youth film Invictus Basketball, directed by Li Feng.

In 2019, Xiong starred in fantasy drama L.O.R.D. Critical World.

Filmography

Film

Television series

Animated film

Variety show

Music video appearances

References

External links
 
 Xiong Naijin on Douban 

1982 births
Beijing Film Academy alumni
Living people
Actresses from Chongqing
21st-century Chinese actresses
Chinese film actresses
Chinese television actresses